Barbery is a commune in the Calvados department in the Normandy region of north-western France.

The inhabitants of the commune are known as Barberigeois or Barberigeoises.

Geography

Barbery is located some 18 km south by south-east of Caen and 10 km east by north-east of Thury-Harcourt. Access to the commune is by the D131 road from Croisilles in the south-west which passes through the heart of the commune and the village before continuing north-east to Urville. The D23 comes from Cesny-Bois-Halbout in the south and passes through the village before continuing north to join Route nationale N158 at Saint-Aignan-de-Cramesnil. The D156A goes south-east from the village to Moulines. The D237 branches off the D131 in the east of the commune and goes south-east to join the D167 east of the commune. Apart from the village there are the hamlets of L'Abbaye, Faverolles, Le Londel, and Le Mesnil Touffray. The commune is entirely farmland.

The Ruisseau du Val Clair rises north of the village and flows north to join the Laize at Bretteville-sur-Laize. The Ruisseau de Corneville also rises north of the village, east of the Ruisseau du Val Clair, and flows north to join the Laize at Les Écluses.

History
During early medieval times Barbery and its abbey were under the control of the de Livet family.

Barbery appears as Barbery on the 1750 Cassini Map and the same on the 1790 version.

Heraldry

Administration

List of Successive Mayors

Demography
In 2017 the commune had 825 inhabitants.

Culture and heritage

Civil heritage
The commune has many buildings and sites that are registered as historical monuments:
The Petite-Abbaye Industrial Cheese Factory (20th century)
Farmhouses (19th century)
A Chateau at Mesnil-Aumont (18th century)
A Manor/Chateau at Mesnil-Touffray (15th century)
The Old Abbey Manor at Faverolles (12th century)

Religious heritage

The commune has several religious buildings and structures that are registered as historical monuments:
The old Cistercian Abbey of Notre-Dame of Barbery (12th century) founded by Robert Marmion in 1181.
The Parish Church of Saint Peter (13th century). The Church contains many items that are registered as historical objects:
Statues (16th-18th century)
A green Sofa, Armchair, and 2 Chairs (19th century)
A Stoup (16th century)
A Baptismal font (16th century)
An Altar and Tabernacle (18th century)
4 Stained glass windows (1909/1932)
A Presbytery (18th century)
The Parish Church of Saint Martin at Mesnil-Touffray (13th century). The Church contains many items that are registered as historical objects:
Statues (16th-20th century)
A Pulpit (18th century) (destroyed)
A Baptismal font (17th century)
An Altar, Tabernacle, and Retable (18th century)
Tombstones (17th-18th century)
A Monument to Charles de Lalongny (1640)

See also
Communes of the Calvados department

References

Communes of Calvados (department)